Ariston was a member of the Paionian royal house, possibly  brother of King Patraus and father of the later king, Audoleon. His service with Alexander the Great, like that of the Thracian Sitalces II and others, helped to ensure the loyalty of his nation to Macedon in the King's absence. He was the commander of the unit of Paionian cavalry. Initially only one squadron strong, the Paionians received 500 reinforcements in Egypt and a further 600 at Susa. 

At the Battle of Gaugamela the Paionian cavalry were placed on the right flank with the sarissophoroi. In 331BC the Paionian cavalry routed a large force of Persian cavalry near the Tigris, Ariston personally slew the Persian leader Satropates; he then presented Alexander with the Persian's severed head. He asked Alexander for a gold cup as a reward for his feat, and the king publicly saluted him and drank to his health.

References

Bibliography
Ashley, J.R. (2004) The Macedonian Empire: The Era of Warfare Under Philip II and Alexander the Great, 359-323 B.C. McFarland.
Heckel, W. (1992) The Marshalls of Alexander's Empire, Psychology Press
Heckel, W. (2006) Who's Who in the Age of Alexander the Great: Prosopography of Alexander's Empire 

Generals of Alexander the Great
Paeonian people